Greek Islands is a restaurant in Chicago, Illinois, founded by Konstantinos Koutsogeorgas and located at 200 S. Halsted Street in the Greektown neighborhood to the immediate west of downtown Chicago.

History
The restaurant was founded in 1971, and does a thriving business to good reviews. Similar to other Greek restaurants in Chicago, it serves saganaki, but has above-average seafood. In January 2008 it was featured on the Food Network's The Hungry Detective. There is a second location in Lombard, Illinois.

References

European restaurants in Chicago
Seafood restaurants in Illinois
Greek restaurants in the United States
Greek-American culture in Chicago
Restaurants established in 1971
1971 establishments in Illinois